William Cochran (1738–1785) was a Scottish painter.

Cochran was born at Strathearn in Clydesdale, and received his first instruction at the Academy of Painting at Glasgow, founded by the two celebrated printers, Robert and Andrew Foulis. About 1761 he went to Italy and studied under Gavin Hamilton, and on his return to Glasgow about 1766 he practised portrait painting both in oil and miniature. Some pieces from fable, executed by him when at Rome, are to be found in
Glasgow. He was a modest artist, and never exhibited his works, nor put his name to them. He died at Glasgow in 1785, and was buried in the cathedral, where a monument was erected to his memory.

References

External links
  William Cochran in Italy
 Paintings in the Scotland museums

1738 births
1785 deaths
18th-century Scottish painters
Scottish male painters
Scottish portrait painters
Portrait miniaturists